Hainesville is a village in Avon Township, Lake County, Illinois,  United States. Per the 2020 census, the population was 3,546. Hainesville has the distinction of being the oldest incorporated community within Lake County.

History
In 1838, a young boy named Elijah M. Haines (1822–1889) and his family moved from New York City to the Chicago area. In 1836, the young boy purchased a farm in Hainesville. During the winter of 1841–42, Haines taught school in Waukegan, Illinois (then known as Little Fort). In 1846, he surveyed and platted Hainesville. On February 26, 1847, the village incorporation papers were drafted. It is recorded that Elijah Haines met Abraham Lincoln in 1847. The two men met frequently and became well acquainted. It has been said that Lincoln spent the night in Hainesville a few times.

In 1848, construction began on the Lake and McHenry Plank Road.  By 1851, the road was completed to Squaw Creek just west of Hainesville, and the settlement became the location for one of three toll houses.

In 1851, Haines was accepted to the bar, and a year later he moved to Waukegan. In 1859, he was sent to the state legislature where he served eight terms. He was a member of the Illinois Constitutional Convention of 1869-70 and is considered by some historians to have been its most influential member.

Hainesville was becoming a thriving village, but the village all but disappeared off the map until recent years.  In 1899, the Milwaukee Road railroad expanded into Lake County, providing convenient transportation from the area into Chicago. Local land owner, general store proprietor and Hainesville postmaster George Battershall asked for a large sum of money to build a train station in Hainesville.  Milwaukee Road had no other options in Hainesville as the railway entered and exited the village of Hainesville on Battershall's property (essentially everything south of the Plank Road in Hainesville).  Amarias M. White, an early settler of what is now Round Lake, knowing that a railroad stop in Round Lake would spark commerce for his area, attracted the railroad company by offering the land for a depot for free.  Unfortunately for Hainesville, commerce did start to move away from Hainesville and into Round Lake, as well as neighboring Grayslake.

The Hainesville post office closed in 1919. A few years later, the old wooden Hainesville School was destroyed by a tornado. In 1940, a new brick structure school was built near the Belvidere Road and Main Street split, but in 1945 the school became part of the Round Lake School system. In 1982, the building became Hainesville's village hall until 2005 when a new hall was built on Hainesville Road.

After several decades of being not much more than a handful of crossroads, Hainesville finally exploded into a sprawling suburban neighborhood. In 1990, large parcels of what was once farm land to the east of Hainesville Road and north of Belvidere Road were developed into Misty Hill Farm by U.S. Shelter Group.  In 1994 Deerpoint Trails was built by Deer Point Homes. In 2000, land around the south side of the former cranberry bog appropriately named Cranberry Lake just east of Hainesville Road was developed into homes.  In 2001, the former Softball City, a multi-use sports complex adjacent to the Avon Township Youth Baseball Organization facilities, sold its land to Ryland Homes, and this became the townhouse community called Union Square.

In 2002, Grayslake Community Consolidated School District (CCSD) 46 built the kindergarten to 4th grade Prairieview School on Belvidere Road.  In 2003, the land to the north of Cranberry Lake, just south of Washington Street, was developed into a townhouse community called Cranberry Lake North.

Despite a census just being taken in 2000, a special census was requested in 2004 due to the explosive growth of the area.  This census yielded a population totaling 3,444, up over 60% from what it was only four years prior.

Geography
Hainesville is located at  (42.348754, -88.068743).

Major streets
  Belvidere Road
  Main Street
 Washington Street
 Hainesville Road

Demographics

2020 census

Note: the US Census treats Hispanic/Latino as an ethnic category. This table excludes Latinos from the racial categories and assigns them to a separate category. Hispanics/Latinos can be of any race.

2000 Census
As of the census of 2000, there were 2,129 people, 701 households, and 586 families living in the village. The racial makeup of the village was 86.10% White, 1.74% African American, 0.09% Native American, 5.64% Asian, 0.05% Pacific Islander, 4.60% from other races, and 1.78% from two or more races. Hispanic or Latino of any race were 9.30% of the population.

Due to the explosive growth within Lake County, a special census was requested in 2004 yielding a population totaling 3,444.

There were 701 households, out of which 54.4% had children under the age of 18 living with them, 75.2% were married couples living together, 6.3% had a female householder with no husband present, and 16.4% were non-families. 11.7% of all households were made up of individuals, and 1.3% had someone living alone who was 65 years of age or older. The average household size was 3.04 and the average family size was 3.33.

In the village, the population was spread out, with 34.5% under the age of 18, 4.7% from 18 to 24, 48.5% from 25 to 44, 9.4% from 45 to 64, and 2.9% who were 65 years of age or older. The median age was 30 years. For every 100 females, there were 102.0 males. For every 100 females age 18 and over, there were 97.7 males.

The median income for a household in the village was $69,938, and the median income for a family was $73,828. Males had a median income of $55,353 versus $33,750 for females. The per capita income for the village was $22,250. About 2.6% of families and 3.9% of the population were below the poverty line, including 6.3% of those under age 18 and none of those age 65 or over.

As of the 2010 US Census, there were 3,597 people living in the village. The racial makeup of the village was 72.95% White, 4.03% African American, 0.81% Native American, 11.76% Asian, 0.03% Pacific Islander, 6.89% from other races, and 3.53% from two or more races. Hispanic or Latino of any race were 16.85% of the population.

References

External links
Village of Hainesville official website

Villages in Illinois
Villages in Lake County, Illinois
Populated places established in 1846
1846 establishments in Illinois